The Kuala Lumpur–Karak Expressway  is a  interstate controlled-access highway in Peninsular Malaysia. It runs between the town of Gombak in Selangor to the southwest and Karak in Pahang to the northeast. The expressway was previously a single-carriageway trunk road forming part of federal route 2; this designation is kept after the upgrade in 1997.

There are some popular legends and folklore about this Expressway. (See also)

Route description
The expressway begins at Gombak, Selangor and its interchange with the Kuala Lumpur Middle Ring Road 2. Next, the expressway passes the Titiwangsa Range and the Genting Sempah Tunnel towards Genting Sempah at the border with Pahang.

The section between Bentong and Karak is the sole route from Kuala Lumpur to Kuantan and vice versa, as Jalan Gombak, which serves as the toll-free alternative for the expressway, ends at Ketari, Bentong. At Karak, route 2 splits off, heading southeast towards the town proper while the expressway heads northeast to meet the East Coast Expressway.

History

Two-lane federal highway
Kuala Lumpur–Karak Highway was originally built in the 1970s by the government of Malaysia as an alternative for the winding, narrow route 68 which runs from Gombak in Kuala Lumpur to Bentong, Pahang. The highway is also a part of route 2. The highway included a 900-metre tunnel at Genting Sempah, which became Malaysia's first highway tunnel ever constructed. It was officially opened in 1979 by Minister of Works and Communications that time Dato Abdul Ghani Gilong.

However, the cost of the construction of this highway was considered as expensive for Malaysia which at that time was an agricultural country. Therefore, the government decided to make Kuala Lumpur–Karak Highway as a toll road to help cover all the construction works. As a result, two toll gates were constructed at Gombak and Bentong and the toll road was administered under Malaysian Highway Authority. The highway was officially opened to traffic in 1977.

Multi-lane expressway
The importance of Kuala Lumpur–Karak Highway as the main road from Kuala Lumpur to eastern states of Peninsular Malaysia resulted in the government's decision to upgrade the highway to a multi-lane expressway by duplicating the whole highway stretch at another side. Thus, the former two-lane highway become a dual-carriageway with six lanes (three in each direction) from Kuala Lumpur to Genting Highlands exit and four lanes (two in each direction) for the rest of the expressway.

The upgrading works also included the construction of a second tunnel located beside the existing tunnel to provide additional two lanes for eastbound traffic, widening the toll gates at Gombak and Bentong and also constructing interchanges to replace junctions. However, some junctions were impossible to be upgraded to interchanges due to their geographical locations and therefore some U-turns were constructed to provide entry and exit to the junction for the opposite direction of the expressway. The expressway has two separate carriageway at Genting Sempah in Selangor–Pahang border (one for Selangor side and one for Pahang side) due to their geographical locations. The upgrade works of the expressway was completed in 1997.

MTD Prime held the concession to operate the expressway. The expressway acquired its official route number, E8, at completion, which resulted in overlapping route numbers. As a result, some maps labelled the expressway as E8 and some other maps labelled the expressway as federal route 2.

On 7 April 2011, ANIH Berhad became the concession holder after taking over operations from MTD Prime Sdn Bhd and Metramac Corporation Sdn Bhd.

Major events
 28 January 1990 – 17 people including 11 FRU riot police personal were killed in a collision between Federal Reserve Unit riot police vehicles, a tanker lorry, a passenger bus and 10 cars at kilometre 32.5 of the highway not far from Genting Sempah Tunnel in Gombak, Selangor.
 11 November 2015 – A landslide has occurred at km 52.4 of the Kuala Lumpur–Karak Expressway between Lentang and Bukit Tinggi, Pahang due to heavy rains. The Lentang–Bukit Tinggi stretch of the expressway was closed to traffic.

Tolls
The Kuala Lumpur–Karak Expressway using opened toll system.

Electronic Toll Collections (ETC)
As part of an initiative to facilitate faster transaction at the Gombak and Bentong Toll Plazas, all toll transactions at both toll plazas on the Kuala Lumpur–Karak Expressway has now conducted electronically via Touch 'n Go cards or SmartTAGs starting 9 September 2015.

Toll rates
(Starting 15 October 2015)

Gombak Toll Plaza (GBK)

Bentong Toll Plaza (BTG)

Note: Toll charges can only be paid with the Touch 'n Go cards and RFID cards or SmartTAG. Cash payment is not accepted.

Interchange list

See also

 Malaysian Expressway System
 East Coast Expressway

References

External links
 ANIH Berhad – concession holder of Karak Expressway
 Malaysian Highway Authority
 Exit lists of Karak Expressway

1979 establishments in Malaysia
East Coast Expressway Networks
Expressways in Malaysia